Cyril Joseph Denneny (December 23, 1891 – September 10, 1970) was a Canadian professional ice hockey forward who played for the Ottawa Senators and Boston Bruins in the National Hockey League and the Toronto Blueshirts of the National Hockey Association.

His younger brother Corbett Denneny also played in the NHL.

Early life
Cy Denneny was born in Farran's Point, Ontario, near Cornwall. He was the son of James Israel Denneny who was a top lacrosse player in the late 19th century and was descended from the Dennenys of County Monaghan, Ireland.

Playing career

Denneny played senior hockey in Cornwall, starting with the Cornwall Sons of England of the Lower Ottawa Valley hockey league in 1909–10. His professional playing career began with the Toronto Ontarios/Shamrocks of the National Hockey Association (NHA) in 1914 (The name of the team changed during the season). He had tried out for the Montreal Canadiens in 1912 but failed to make the team and he returned to senior hockey. He was traded to the Ottawa Senators in 1916 and he would play with the Senators until 1928.

With the Senators during the 1917–18 season, Denneny set an NHL record by opening the season with four straight multi-goal games, a record that was tied in 2013 by San Jose Sharks' forward Patrick Marleau. Denneny was a member of four Senators Stanley Cup-winning teams; in 1920, 1921, 1923 and 1927. He faced his brother Corbett during the 1923 Stanley Cup playoffs, a series which also featured brothers Frank and Georges Boucher. This marked the first time two different sets of brothers faced each other in an NHL or Big Four championship series.

Denneny was sold to Boston in 1928, where he would be an assistant playing-coach of the Bruins' 1929 Stanley Cup-winner. In 1929, Denneny retired to become an NHL on-ice official. In 1932, he re-joined the Senators as head coach, but the team was in decline due to financial difficulties which forced management to sell top players in order to survive. The team finished last and Denneny was not retained as coach.

Denneny was one of the top scorers in the NHL from 1917 through 1925. While leading the league in scoring during the 1923–24 NHL season, he did so by recording 22 goals and one assist for a total of 23 points, the lowest winning total in NHL history. When he retired, he was the all-time top scorer in NHL history. He was inducted into the Hockey Hall of Fame in 1959. In 1998, he was ranked number 62 on The Hockey News' list of the 100 Greatest Hockey Players. He was the first and fastest player in NHL history to score 200 goals (181 GP). During a six-week span in the 1920–21 NHL season, Cy and his brother Corbett  (Toronto St. Patricks), each scored six goals during a game—a feat accomplished by only five other players in the history of the NHL.

Playing style
Despite not being a swift skater, Denneny had one of the most deceptive and accurate shots in the league, which enabled him to achieve his scoring feats so rapidly. He was one of the first known players to use opposing defencemen as screens, and would beat goaltenders with head fakes and subsequently with shots that often would not leave the ice. Denneny was also one of the first players to use a curved blade, which he used to take high-rising shots as well as "sinkers" that would fool goaltenders. He was a very physical player who often acted as an enforcer for his linemates, Jack Darragh and Frank Nighbor.

Personal life
Denneny was married twice. His first wife Melvina died, and Denneny remarried. He was the father of two daughters with his second wife Isobel. After Denneny retired from hockey, he worked for the Canadian federal government. He retired from the civil service in 1959. He died on September 10, 1970, and is buried in Ottawa's Pinecrest Cemetery.

Career statistics

* Stanley Cup Champion.

NHL coaching record

See also
 List of players with five or more goals in a National Hockey League game

References

External links
 
 

1891 births
1970 deaths
Boston Bruins coaches
Boston Bruins players
Canadian ice hockey coaches
Canadian ice hockey left wingers
Canadian people of Irish descent
Hockey Hall of Fame inductees
Ice hockey people from Ontario
National Hockey League scoring leaders (prior to 1947–48)
Ottawa Senators (1917) players
Ottawa Senators (NHA) players
Ottawa Senators coaches
People from the United Counties of Stormont, Dundas and Glengarry
Sportspeople from Cornwall, Ontario
Stanley Cup champions
Stanley Cup championship-winning head coaches
Toronto Blueshirts players
Toronto Shamrocks players
Ice hockey player-coaches